Fredrik Eriksson (born 12 November 1975) is a Swedish politician and member of the Sweden Democrats party.

Eriksson studied at the University of Gothenburg and was employed in the healthcare industry before getting involved in politics. He served as group leader for the Sweden Democrats on the municipal council of Partille. Eriksson first became a member of the Riksdag in 2014 to stand in for party leader Jimmie Akesson who was on sick leave before becoming a full member of the Riksdag.

References 

Living people
1975 births
Members of the Riksdag from the Sweden Democrats
Members of the Riksdag 2014–2018
University of Gothenburg alumni
21st-century Swedish politicians